John Callender (3 September 1903 – 13 December 1980) was an English footballer who played as a right winger for Walker Celtic, Brighton & Hove Albion, Chesterfield, Ashington, Lincoln City, Port Vale, and Gateshead.

Career
Callender played for Walker Celtic and Brighton & Hove Albion, before scoring one goal in five Third Division North games for Chesterfield in 1934. After a spell with Ashington, he moved on to Lincoln City. The "Imps" finished second in the Third Division North in 1936–37, three points behind champions Stockport County. They then dropped to seventh place in 1937–38. He scored 26 goals in 75 league games in his two seasons at Sincil Bank. He joined Port Vale in May 1938. He played three Third Division South games, scoring one goal in the season opening 3–1 defeat to Aldershot at The Old Recreation Ground on 27 August. He was handed a free transfer in April 1939. He moved on to Third Division North club Gateshead, scoring two goals in three appearances before the league was abandoned after the outbreak of World War II. Callender guested for Mansfield Town during World War II.

Career statistics
Source:

Honours
Lincoln City
Football League Third Division North second-place promotion: 1936–37

References

People from Wylam
Footballers from Northumberland
English footballers
Association football midfielders
Walker Celtic F.C. players
Brighton & Hove Albion F.C. players
Chesterfield F.C. players
Ashington A.F.C. players
Lincoln City F.C. players
Port Vale F.C. players
Gateshead F.C. players
Mansfield Town F.C. wartime guest players
English Football League players
1903 births
1980 deaths